Jacqueline Georgette Cantrelle is a French actress born in Paris on 23 September 1927.

She is the daughter of the violinist William Cantrelle (1888-1956) and the comedian Marianne Cantrelle (1900-1972). Her grandmother was the actress Bleuette Bernon (1878-after 1919).

Filmography
 1930: Eau, gaz et amour à tous les étages, by Roger Lion
 1947: Les maris de Léontine, by René Le Hénaff
 1950: La vie est un jeu, by Raymond Leboursier
 1951: Casque d'or, by Jacques Becker
 1952: La Minute de vérité, by Jean Delannoy
 1955: Lola Montès, by Max Ophüls

Theatre
 4 July 1942: Les jours heureux, by Claude-André Puget at Salle Don Bosco
 1 September 1943: Monsieur de Falindor by Georges Manoir and André Verhylle at Théâtre Monceau
 11 November 1955: Le Système Ribadier, by Georges Feydeau

References

External links
 

1927 births
Possibly living people
Actresses from Paris
French film actresses
French stage actresses
20th-century French actresses